12 Camelopardalis is a binary star in the northern circumpolar constellation of Camelopardalis, located 700 light years away from the Sun as determined from parallax measurements. It forms a double star with 11 Camelopardalis, which is only 3 arcminutes away. The system has the variable star designation BM Camelopardalis; 12 Camelopardalis is the Flamsteed designation. It is just visible to the naked eye, appearing as a dim, orange-hued star with an apparent visual magnitude of 6.08. The system is moving closer to the Earth with a heliocentric radial velocity of −2 km/s.

Abt et al. (1969) determined this to be a single-lined spectroscopic binary system and computed an orbital solution with a period of 80.17 days and an eccentricity of 0.35. Hall et al. (1995) made additional measurements, finding an orbital period of 80.9 days and an eccentricity that is statistically indistinguishable from zero.

The visible component is an evolved giant star with a stellar classification of K0 IIIe, showing strong emission lines. It is an RS Canum Venaticorum variable and its brightness varies by 0.14 magnitudes with a period of 82.9 days due to starspots. The star is most likely rotating in synchronous manner with its orbital period. The magnetic activity has two overlapping cycles of 14.8 and 8.5 years, with the activity occurring at two latitudes. BM Cam emits X-rays and is the designated X-ray source 1H 0501+592. It has been detected by HEAO 1, the Einstein Observatory, and ROSAT.

References

K-type giants
RS Canum Venaticorum variables
Astronomical X-ray sources
Spectroscopic binaries
Double stars
Camelopardalis (constellation)
Durchmusterung objects
Camelopardalis, 12
032357
023743
1623
Camelopardalis, BM